Servants to the government of Pakistan refers to all those serving officials either civil or military, who perform their duties while serving their outfits in federal, provincial or district areas of the government of Pakistan.Recruitment in services is carried out irrespective of the gender, ethnic, racial, sectarian distinction. Moreover, vacancies of staff members in any department, organization or ministry are allotted after the formal decision of the legislators in respective divisions of parliament and government. Each of the outfit has its authorized strength and allocated equipment specified for official task and job. Recruitment both at tier and occupation in service and group vary commensurate with qualification. All services are organized in hierarchical order and officials serving therein are categorized in various grades (basic pay scale structure) for the sake of smooth, transparent and meticulous execution of task and are paid accordingly. Normally services for officials are classified into four categories based on their grade. They include the following

1. BPS-16 to -22: Gazetted officers, commissioned officers and Junior Commissioned Officers (JCO) in the military. 
 As per Armed Forces Law Manuals, JCOs (Junior Commissioned Officers) are Commissioned Officer / Gazetted Officers.
Junior commissioned officer means, a person commissioned, gazetted or in pay as junior commissioned officer in the army.
References: army act 1952,*P N ordinance 1961, manual of naval law Navy regulations and *Pakistan Air Force act 1953.

2. BPS-11 to -15: Non gazetted officers, junior officers and field supervisors. 

3. BPS-5 to -10: Lower grade officials, field work supervisors, SNCOs and NCOs.

4) BPS-1 to -4: Laborers and field workers, Class 4 workers.

Need for Standardization of Government Appointments 

There has always remained ambiguity in determining the status, designation, level and rank of appointments held by the incumbents. In most countries, nomenclature for sanctioned government positions are standardized, thus, helpful in determining the position of the jobholder. After carrying out detailed research, the following 10 levels are recommended for all gazetted appointment holders in public sector. This will ultimately help in boosting the motivation level of all Government Servants. (It will soon be followed by proposed level for non gazetted public sector employees).

Executive Services of Pakistan

Junior Scale Services of Pakistan

Note for Consideration 

Pay emoluments, allowances, pensions and all perks and privileges of government serving/retired servants not only vary with the status, rank, appointment and service but also with their affiliated services. For example:- An officer holding the appointment of additional secretary in Federal Government is of grade 21. However, the appointment when being held by incumbent in Provincial Government will of grade 19. So, appointment also vary in scale depending on the affiliated services of individual.

Levels of Basic Pay Scale of Government Servants in Pakistan
Though there are also some other Pay Scale Systems in Pakistan except Basic Pay Scale Structure (BPS) but BPS is widely used pay scale system in Pakistan. Most of the Government Departments and Organizations follow BPS System. SPS and army scales are examples of other pay systems in Pakistan while private organizations/companies/industries are free to make their own pay structures while Government fixes a minimum salary of any private employee.
BPS scales are regularly revised after every few years. These were revised in 2008 and, after three years, these were once again revised in 2011 and again, after four years, these were once again revised in 2015, keeping in view the inflation rate in Pakistan. As of now, Basic Pay Scale Structure 2022 has been introduced.

Note: Minimum Pay, Maximum Pay, Annual Increments and all other allowances etc. are in Pakistani rupees.
Civil servants are also entitled to various other allowances (as per their department/organization rules and their service terms) along with their basic pay, as a part of their Gross Pay. These allowances may include Ad hoc Relief Allowance, Medical Allowance, Special Pay, Conveyance Allowance, House Rent allowance and several other miscellaneous allowances, which are applicable.

Federal Government and provincial governments have their separate pay systems closely similar to each other.

Promotion opportunities
The Central Selection Board (CSB) of the Federal Public Service Commission conduct exam/test to select 16-22 grade officer without passing FPSC exam non of any government servant promotes and FPSC supposed to meet twice in a year to consider promotion opportunities for the appointed employees of Civil Service of Pakistan.

See also
Federal Public Service Commission 2022
Pakistan Civilian jobs
Pakistan Administrative Service
Pakistan Civil Aviation Authority
Civil Services Academy Lahore

References

External links
Senior Finance Officer International Organization Islamabad
Federal Public Service Commission homepage 
History of Civil Service of Pakistan and Foreign Service of Pakistan
Punjab Public Service Commission homepage
Latest Ministry of Energy Power Division Jobs 2023

Civil service of Pakistan
Pakistani civil servants
Pakistani government officials